The 2007 New Forest District Council election took place on 3 May 2007 to elect members to the New Forest District Council, on the same day as other local elections. The election for Bramshaw, Copythorne North and Minstead was postponed due to the death of a candidate, and therefore a by-election was held on 14 June.

Election Summary 
The Conservatives won 13 seats new seats (14 including the Bramshaw, Copythorne North and Minstead by-election), increasing their majority, with the Liberal Democrats losing half (14) their seats, and the independent councillor Daniel Cracknell retaining his seat. Whilst not gaining representation, the Green and Labour parties increased their vote share.

Ward Results

Ashurst, Copythorne South and Netley Marsh

Barton

Bashley

Becton

Boldre and Sway

Bransgore and Burley

Brockenhurst and Forest South East

Buckland

Butts Ash and Dibden Purlieu

Dibden and Hythe East

Downlands and Forest

Fawley, Blackfield and Langley

Fernhill

Fordingbridge

Forest North West

Furzedown and Hardley

Holbury and North Blackfield

Hordle

Hythe West and Langdown

Lymington Town

Lyndhurst

Marchwood

Milford

Milton

Pennington

Ringwood East and Sopley

Ringwood North

Ringwood South

Totton Central

Totton East

Totton North

Totton South

Totton West

Bramshaw, Copythorne North and Minstead by-election 
Whilst an election for the ward of Bramshaw, Copythrone North and Minstead was due to take place alongside the other elections the death of a candidate lead to a by election being held in June, just over a month later.

References

Notes 

2007 English local elections
New Forest District Council elections
2000s in Hampshire